David Earl Hill (born January 1, 1954) is an American former professional football player who was a tight end in the National Football League (NFL). He played for twelve seasons for the Detroit Lions and the Los Angeles Rams. He was selected to two Pro Bowls while playing for the Lions. He is the younger brother of former Green Bay Packers defensive back and longtime KCBS-TV sports anchor Jim Hill.  He appears in the music video for the Dire Straits song, "Walk of Life", doing an end zone celebration while a member of the Detroit Lions.

Hill also appeared in the 1986 Rams promotional video, Let's Ram It, where he went by the name "Big Daddy Hill" and states that he likes to block, but doesn't want Eric Dickerson running over him.

References

External links
NFL.com player page

1954 births
Living people
American football tight ends
Texas A&M–Kingsville Javelinas football players
Detroit Lions players
Los Angeles Rams players
National Conference Pro Bowl players
Players of American football from San Antonio